The 2015 Nigerian House of Representatives elections in Kano State was held on March 28, 2015, to elect members of the House of Representatives to represent Kano State, Nigeria.

Overview

Summary

Results

Albasu/Gaya/Ajingi 
Party candidates registered with the Independent National Electoral Commission to contest in the election. APC candidate Abdullahi Mahmud Gaya won the election.

Bebeji/Kiru 
Party candidates registered with the Independent National Electoral Commission to contest in the election. APC candidate Abdulmumin Jibrin won the election.

Bichi 
Party candidates registered with the Independent National Electoral Commission to contest in the election. APC candidate Ahmed Garba Bichi won the election.

Dala 
Party candidates registered with the Independent National Electoral Commission to contest in the election. APC candidate Aliyu Sani Madaki won the election.

Danbatta/Makoda 
Party candidates registered with the Independent National Electoral Commission to contest in the election. APC candidate Ayuba Badamasi won the election.

Doguwa/Tudun Wada 
Party candidates registered with the Independent National Electoral Commission to contest in the election. APC candidate Alhassan Ado Garba D. won the election.

Dawakin Kudu/Warawa 
Party candidates registered with the Independent National Electoral Commission to contest in the election. APC candidate Mustapha Dawaki won the election.

Dawakin Tofa/Tofa/Rimin Gado 
Party candidates registered with the Independent National Electoral Commission to contest in the election. APC candidate Jobe Tijjani Abdulkadir won the election.

Fagge 
Party candidates registered with the Independent National Electoral Commission to contest in the election. APC candidate Sulaiman Aminu won the election.

Gabasawa/Gezawa 
Party candidates registered with the Independent National Electoral Commission to contest in the election. APC candidate Musa Ado won the election.

Gwarzo/Kabo 
Party candidates registered with the Independent National Electoral Commission to contest in the election. APC candidate Nasiru Garo Sule won the election.

Gwale 
Party candidates registered with the Independent National Electoral Commission to contest in the election. APC candidate Garba Ibrahim Mohammed won the election.

Kumbotso 
Party candidates registered with the Independent National Electoral Commission to contest in the election. APC candidate Dan Agundi Munir Babba won the election.

Kano Municipal 
Party candidates registered with the Independent National Electoral Commission to contest in the election. APC candidate Danburam Abubakar Nuhu won the election.

Kunchi/Tsanyawa 
Party candidates registered with the Independent National Electoral Commission to contest in the election. APC candidate Bala Sani Umar won the election.

Karaye/Rogo 
Party candidates registered with the Independent National Electoral Commission to contest in the election. APC candidate Shehu Usman Aliyu won the election.

Kura/Madobi/Garun Malam 
Party candidates registered with the Independent National Electoral Commission to contest in the election. APC candidate Muktar Mohammed Chiromawa won the election.

Minjibir/Ungogo 
Party candidates registered with the Independent National Electoral Commission to contest in the election. APC candidate Bashir Baballe won the election.

Nasarawa 
Party candidates registered with the Independent National Electoral Commission to contest in the election. APC candidate Nassir Ali Ahmad won the election.

Rano/Bunkure/Kibiya 
Party candidates registered with the Independent National Electoral Commission to contest in the election. APC candidate Sani Muhammad Aliyu won the election.

Sumaila/Takai 
Party candidates registered with the Independent National Electoral Commission to contest in the election. APC candidate Kawu Suleiman Abdurrahman won the election.

Shanono/Bagwai 
Party candidates registered with the Independent National Electoral Commission to contest in the election. APC candidate Sulaiman Aliyu Romo won the election.

Tarauni 
Party candidates registered with the Independent National Electoral Commission to contest in the election. APC candidate Nasiru Baballe Ila won the election.

Wudil/Garko 
Party candidates registered with the Independent National Electoral Commission to contest in the election. APC candidate Kabiru Wudil Muhammad Ali won the election.

References 

Kano State